Saint Ursus (Orso, Ours) may refer to:

Ursus of Aosta, 6th-century evangelist
Ursus of Auxerre, 6th-century bishop 

Ursus of Solothurn, 3rd-century martyr